Patrick J. Burns was the inaugural Mayor of Bathurst, New Brunswick from the foundation of the Town in October 1912 until his untimely death in office of heart disease on 23 February 1915.

Burns was in 1895 a principal of the re-formed Adams, Burns and Company, a successor upon bankruptcy of the St. Lawrence Lumber Company.

Burns was born in County Tipperary, Ireland; a Catholic, he lived until 70 years of age. He fathered with wife Elizabeth White one son, Kennedy Francis, and two daughters, firstborn Mary Agnes and youngest Monique Vincent.

Notes

Mayors of Bathurst, New Brunswick
Businesspeople from New Brunswick
1915 deaths
Year of birth missing